Leptecodon (meaning "small tooth") is a genus of prehistoric ray-finned fish which was described by Williston in 1899 and was possibly preyed on by other sea creatures. However, it was a hunter of smaller creatures itself. This fish sometimes hid in clams such as Inoceramus. The first-discovered fossil was inside a clam. Many believe that Leptecodon had formed a symbiotic relationship with the clam rather than get eaten by Inoceramus. Another fish from the same time and place, Caproberyx, has also been found among ''Inoceramus.

References

Prehistoric aulopiformes
Prehistoric ray-finned fish genera
Taxa named by Samuel Wendell Williston
Prehistoric fish of North America
Cretaceous bony fish